Hartogiella is a genus of flowering plants within the family Celastraceae.

It contains one species, Hartogiella schinoides (known as the spoonwood or smalblad), a medium-sized tree from the southern Western Cape province of South Africa. It has opposing leaves that show elastic threads when broken, and red fleshy fruit that becomes dry later in the year.

References

External links 

 Southern Cape Trees & Shrubs

Trees of South Africa
Trees of Mediterranean climate
Monotypic rosid genera
Celastrales genera
Celastraceae